The Confederate Mass Grave Monument in Somerset in Pulaski County, Kentucky, near Nancy, Kentucky, honors the Confederate soldiers who are buried here who died at the Battle of Mill Springs.  These soldiers were from Alabama, Mississippi, and Tennessee, and number over one hundred in total.

The monument was built in 1910 by Bennett H. Young, who during the war rode with Confederate general John Hunt Morgan. Young was drawn to the area due to hearing about the nearby Zollie Tree, which was decorated by a local woman each Memorial Day in honor of general Felix K. Zollicoffer, who died at the Battle of Mill Springs. The monument uses the name "Battle of Fishing Creek", as the battle was known by Southerners in 1910.

The Zollie Tree, for which both the Confederate Mass Grave Monument and the nearby General Felix K. Zollicoffer Monument was constructed, was destroyed by lightning in 1995, although a sapling from it was later planted at the same spot.  Both are now in what is called Zollicoffer Park, part of the larger Mill Springs Battlefield.

On July 17, 1997, the Confederate Mass Grave Monument in Somerset was one of sixty-one different monuments related to the Civil War in Kentucky placed on the National Register of Historic Places, as part of the Civil War Monuments of Kentucky Multiple Property Submission.  The aforementioned General Felix K. Zollicoffer Monument only a few feet away is another of the so-honored monuments.  The other monument on the list in Pulaski County is the Battle of Dutton's Hill Monument north of Somerset, Kentucky.

Gallery

References

Civil War Monuments of Kentucky MPS
National Register of Historic Places in Pulaski County, Kentucky
Confederate States of America monuments and memorials in Kentucky
1910 sculptures
1910 establishments in Kentucky
Battle of Mill Springs